Russell Withey (born 18 November 1991) is a Botswana cricketer. He played in the 2015 ICC World Cricket League Division Six tournament.

References

External links
 

1991 births
Living people
Botswana cricketers
Cricketers from Johannesburg
South African emigrants to Botswana